"Hagnagora" mesenata is a species of moth of the family Geometridae first described by Felder and Rogenhofer in 1875. It is found in Chile.

Taxonomy
The species was provisionally removed from the genus Hagnagora. The wing pattern and particularly the wing shape diverge strongly from species in this genus.

References

Moths described in 1875
Larentiinae
Moths of South America
Endemic fauna of Chile